Snow White: The Fairest of Them All  is a 2001 fantasy adventure television film co-written and directed by Caroline Thompson and produced by Hallmark Entertainment. The film was first released theatrically in Europe, and subsequently aired in the United States on ABC as part of their series on The Wonderful World of Disney on March 17, 2002.

Based upon the traditional Snow White folktale first recorded in 1812 by German folklorists the Brothers Grimm, the film deviates from earlier interpretations of the story in several respects. Set in a fantasy kingdom, it tells the story of Snow White (Kristin Kreuk), and the attempts of her malevolent stepmother, Queen Elspeth (Miranda Richardson), to eliminate her. Trying to escape Queen Elspeth's machinations, Snow White flees to the forest, where she befriends Sunday (Michael J. Anderson), the leader of the seven dwarfs, and together they plot the monarch's overthrow.

Reviews were mixed, with Richardson's performance receiving praise, but Kreuk's coming under criticism for being too bland. The film would subsequently be released on DVD.

Plot
John and Josephine deeply wish to have a child and when she is born with skin as white as snow, lips as red as blood and hair as black as ebony, they name her Snow White. However, Josephine dies in childbirth, leaving John alone with their child. In the winter, John struggles to find food for his daughter, eventually collapsing and shedding a tear over a frozen lake, which frees a creature known as the Green-Eyed One. As thanks for freeing him, the Green-Eyed One asks John what he needs. John requests milk for his daughter, and the Green-Eyed One grants his wish. John then asks to have his wife back, calling Josephine his Queen, but the Green-Eyed One cannot resurrect the dead. However, he says he can give John a Queen, and John suddenly finds himself a king with his own kingdom.

Since the Green-Eyed One is obligated to fulfill John's wishes, he pays a visit to Elspeth, his hideous spellcasting sister. He transforms her into a beautiful young woman who can now marry John and become his queen and Snow White's stepmother. The creature also provides Elspeth with a magical mirror that allows her to see others unseen and to deceive John. As years pass, Elspeth forms a good relationship with her new husband and stepdaughter, now a beautiful sixteen-year-old princess. However, Elspeth is vain and keeps a room full of magical mirrors which assure her each day that she is the fairest of them all whenever she asks.

When Prince Alfred arrives in the kingdom and falls in love with Snow White, Elspeth is furious to discover that images of Snow White are appearing in her mirrors, which means that her stepdaughter is the fairest of them all. Driven with jealousy, Elspeth orders a hunter, Hector, to take Snow White into the forest and kill her, and then return with Snow White's heart for her to consume. In the meantime, Elspeth also transforms Alfred into a bear. Unable to kill Snow White, Hector presents Elspeth with the heart of a wild boar instead. When she learns the truth, Elspeth kills Hector, imprisons John in her mirrors and stifles Snow White with an enchanted ribbon.

Snow White is saved by seven dwarfs, each named after the days of the week and possessing the power to transform into a rainbow to move from one place to another (but are only capable if all seven of them are present). The eldest is Sunday, who is a victim of one of Elspeth's spells that has left half of him as a garden gnome. The dwarfs allow Snow White to care for their home, though the dwarf Wednesday is initially suspicious. When Elspeth learns that Snow White is still alive, she prepares a poisoned apple and transforms into Snow White's deceased mother, Josephine, with the magic mirror the Green-Eyed One gave her. Aided by Monday, who is turned into a garden gnome afterward, Elspeth (disguised as Josephine) finds Snow White and convinces her to eat the enchanted and poisoned apple, which seemingly kills Snow White.

With her task finished, Elspeth tries to use the mirror to become the Queen again but she instead reverts to her true form, even more loathsome than before. The Green-Eyed One appears and reveals that her evil deed has cost Elspeth her beauty. Meanwhile, the dwarfs, unable to revive Snow White, place her in a coffin of ice and leave her near Monday's statue. When she receives a kiss of true love from Prince Alfred (in his bear form) she is revived. The spells on Alfred, Sunday and Monday are broken and Elspeth's mirrors shatter, freeing John. Elspeth is cornered and killed by the gnomes she had turned to stone, who have been released from their enchantments. Freed from Elspeth, the Green-Eyed One is able to go his way. Snow White and Alfred live happily ever after while the dwarfs decide to move on to find Sleeping Beauty.

Cast

 Miranda Richardson as Queen Elspeth, Snow White's stepmother
 Karin Konoval as Crone, Elspeth's old hag form
 Kristin Kreuk as Snow White
 Tom Irwin as John, Snow White's father
 Vera Farmiga as Josephine, Snow White's mother
 Tyron Leitso as Prince Alfred
 Clancy Brown as the Granter of Wishes
 Michael Gilden as Monday, the red dwarf
 Mark J. Trombino as Tuesday, the orange dwarf
 Vincent Schiavelli as Wednesday, the yellow dwarf
 Penny Blake as Thursday, the green dwarf
 Martin Klebba as Friday, the blue dwarf
 Warwick Davis as Saturday, the indigo dwarf
 Michael J. Anderson as Sunday, the violet dwarf
 Jose Zuniga as Hector, the Huntsman

Development
In order to write the script, Caroline Thompson went back to the original written account of Snow White, published by the Brothers Grimm in 1812. She came to the decision that the folktale was about the "fear of change", as two women, Snow White and her stepmother, came to adjust with the changes that they were facing in life. Noting that the original 19th century folk tales were far "darker" in content than most 20th century adaptations, such as Walt Disney's Snow White and the Seven Dwarfs (1937), she sought to utilise some of these dark elements in her adaptation. The idea for the Green-Eyed One was introduced by co-writer Julie Hickson; Thompson noted that he was a "genuinely moral being" who tried to help people, comparing him to the genius of the peace found in Late Medieval literature.

Upon reading the script, Kristin Kreuk noted that she had been "entranced", believing that the main message that audiences would take away from the film was that of not judging an individual's personality based upon their physical appearances. Richardson thought that Caroline Thompson's adaptation was "much more in keeping" with the ethos of the Grimm tale than subsequent adaptations due to its "darker" nature. Praising Miranda Richardson as being perfect for the role of Elspeth, Caroline Thompson asserted that she had been "a blast to work with." Caroline Thompson noted that she cast the actors to play the dwarves according to their own individual personalities; she remarked that Warwick Davis was a "phenomenal actor" while Penny Blake was "so funny" and Michael J. Anderson was a "genius." Together, she thought that they brought an "array of talents" to the production. Michael J. Anderson himself claimed that he identified with his character, the "philosopher of the group", and really enjoyed playing the role. Commenting on his character of Wednesday, Vincent Schiavelli noted that he was miserable because "he really thinks that he's a dwarf" even though he isn't.

Caroline Thompson would also praise her "magnificent collaborators" in costume and set design. The set designer noted that they constructed a castle that they felt was best described as "Viking art nouveau."

Filming took place in and around Vancouver, Canada.

Release
The film was released theatrically in Europe and the Middle East in 2001, and debuted in the United States on March 17, 2002, when it was broadcast as part of ABC's The Wonderful World of Disney series. Both Region 1 and Region 2 DVDs of the film were released. Reviewing the Artisan DVD release for the Combustible Celluloid website, Jeffrey M. Anderson praised its "gorgeous full-screen transfer", featurette, and cast-and-crew biographies, but highlighted that it contained no director's commentary track.

Reception
Laura Fries reviewed the film for Variety, describing it as a "unique and lavish production that certainly warrants attention" but warning that it would be inappropriate for young children. Asserting that ABC had made a "big mistake" by airing it as a part of their Wonderful World of Disney series, she thought that it was "often nightmarish", harking back to the original Grimm version more than the better-known Disney adaptation; in particular, she singled out the "evil queen/witch" and "satanic messenger who grants wishes." However, she praised David Brisbin's set design, remarking that he had created a kingdom which was "equal parts gingerbread baroque and David Lynch" and that Caroline Thompson "clearly relishes" in this universe. Noting that the "magnificently villainous performance" from Miranda Richardson "virtually steals the show" from the "doe-eyed" Kristin Kreuk, she believes that the latter does "little to upgrade" the image of Snow White as the most victimized of fairytale characters.

Writing for The New York Times, Hal Erickson praised the film for mixing its "more frightening aspects" with "slapstick comedy and awesome special effects." Jeffrey M. Anderson reviewed Snow White for the Combustible Celluloid website, awarding it three stars out of four. Remarking that Thompson "completely eradicates" the Disney interpretation of the folktale, he praised her directorial debut, noting the influence of Tim Burton but claiming that she offers "a more universal sweetness" than he does. He notes that while remaining accessible to children, the film still "drinks more deeply of the story's dark elements". David Parkinson of Radio Times awarded Snow White two stars out of five, praising Miranda Richardson's performance and comparing it to that of Sigourney Weaver in Snow White: A Tale of Terror. He also acclaimed the casting of Vincent Schiavelli as the tall dwarf, but in contrast, he criticised Kristin Kreuk's "inanimate performance", seeing her as a "dull heroine." M.S. Mason of the Christian Science Monitor said: "Beautiful young Kristin Kreuk makes a lovely Snow White" although felt that the film was only "passable family fare".

References

External links
 

2001 films
2001 television films
American fantasy adventure films
American television films
Canadian fantasy adventure films
Canadian television films
German fantasy adventure films
German television films
Films based on Snow White
Sonar Entertainment films
Films directed by Caroline Thompson
Films scored by Michael Convertino
Films shot in Vancouver
2000s fantasy adventure films
Films about royalty
Films about witchcraft
Films with screenplays by Caroline Thompson
2000s American films
2000s Canadian films
2000s German films